Michel Tremblay is a Quebec playwright.

Michel Tremblay may also refer to:

Michel Tremblay (politician) (born 1933), Quebec politician

See also
Roland Michel Tremblay (born 1972), French-Canadian writer